The Battle of Kardia was a naval battle fought in  between the fleets of the Byzantine Empire and the Cretan Saracens off Kardia, in the Gulf of Saros. The battle was a major Byzantine victory.

According to the 10th-century chronicler Theophanes Continuatus—whose work was later reused almost without change by the 11th-century historian John Skylitzes—in the early years of the reign of the Emperor Basil I the Macedonian, the Arab emir of Crete, Shu'ayb ("Saet" in Greek), son of the founder of the emirate, Abu Hafs, sent a Greek renegade called Photios, "a warlike and energetic fellow", on a major raiding expedition against the Byzantine Empire. The fleet led by Photios comprised over 50 vessels, including 27 heavy vessels (koumbaria) and many lighter galleys.

This fleet plundered the shores of the Aegean Sea, looting and taking prisoners to be sold as slaves, and even penetrated into the Propontis and reached Prokonnesos, in the vicinity of Constantinople; the first time since the Second Arab Siege of Constantinople in 717–718 that a Muslim fleet had come so close to the Byzantine capital. The Byzantine response was headed by the droungarios of the Fleet, Niketas Ooryphas, who met the Saracen fleet in battle off Kardia, in the Gulf of Saros. The battle was a major victory for the Byzantines, who destroyed twenty Saracen vessels through the use of Greek fire, and forced the rest to flee back to Crete.

Some time after this defeat, Photios led another raid against Greece, but Ooryphas once again caught up with him and destroyed his fleet, killing Photios.

References

Sources
 
 
 
 
 

870s in the Byzantine Empire
Kardia
Kardia
Kardia
Medieval Aegean Sea
Kardia
Military raids